The following buildings were added to the National Register of Historic Places as part of the Orange Park, Florida Multiple Property Submission (or MPS).

Notes

 Orange Park
National Register of Historic Places Multiple Property Submissions in Florida